This is a list of Pittsburgh Panthers football players in the NFL Draft.

Key

Selections

Notable undrafted players
Note: No drafts held before 1936

See also
List of University of Pittsburgh faculty
List of University of Pittsburgh alumni

References

Pittsburgh

Pittsburgh Panthers NFL Draft